Donald MacBeth (August 29, 1949 – March 1, 1987) was a Canadian Hall of Fame jockey in North American Thoroughbred racing.

Born in Red Deer, Alberta, Macbeth rode horses at Alberta racetracks before going to race in the United States. Among horses of note, he rode Deputy Minister, winner of the 1981 Sovereign and  Eclipse awards for Outstanding Two-Year-Old Male Horse in Canada and the United States. In Japan, MacBeth rode Half Iced to victory in the 1982 Japan Cup and Chief's Crown to a win in the 1984 Breeders' Cup Juvenile, the 1985 Blue Grass Stakes, and the 1985 Marlboro Cup. He also won the prestigious Washington, D.C. International in 1985 aboard Vanlandingham for trainer Shug McGaughey.

A 1991 Southern Florida Sun-Sentinel newspaper story referred to MacBeth as being "among the most respected of jockeys, known well for his gentle nature and integrity."

MacBeth was the leading jockey at Monmouth Park for three years running between 1978 and 1980. He won 2,764 races before cancer ended his racing career. For his significant contribution to the sport of horse racing, MacBeth received the Avelino Gomez Memorial Award and the George Woolf Memorial Jockey Award.

A resident of Reddick, Florida at the time of his passing in 1987, the following year MacBeth was inducted posthumously into the Canadian Horse Racing Hall of Fame.

MacBeth Memorial Jockey Fund
After doing a show at a racetrack near Minneapolis, Minnesota, devoted fan and sometime racehorse owner, comedic actor Tim Conway had wanted to donate his fee to help former jockeys experiencing hard times but learned that no such fund existed. In cooperation with Don MacBeth's widow, Conway became a co-founder, Vice President, and member of the board of directors of the Don MacBeth Memorial Jockey Fund to assist injured and disabled riders. As of March 2007, the Fund had assisted more than 1,800 riders.

References

Canadian jockeys
American jockeys
Avelino Gomez Memorial Award winners
Canadian Horse Racing Hall of Fame inductees
Sportspeople from Red Deer, Alberta
Canadian people of Scottish descent
1949 births
1987 deaths
Deaths from lung cancer
Canadian emigrants to the United States